"Rock 'n' Roll Lifestyle" is the debut single by Sacramento alternative rock band Cake.  This song was first played by KWOD (now known as KUDL). It was later released on Cake's debut album, Motorcade of Generosity. Only 500 copies were issued.

The song was used for an Ikea advertisement in Sweden.

Track listing
"Rock 'n' Roll Lifestyle" – 4:14
"Jolene" – 5:19

Lyrics
The song sarcastically pokes fun at details the life of a rock fan who tries to show how cool he is by living a life of drinking, drugs, and music. It's all about the style of being a rock fan more than having any true passion for music.

The lyrics point out that "excess ain't rebellion", that the person is "drinking what they're selling", "your self destruction doesn't hurt them, your chaos won't convert them"; essentially, the character simply purchased their "rebellious" lifestyle, thus supporting those they were trying to provoke.

Music video
The music video for this song was filmed at Safetyville USA in Sacramento.

Sleeve and matrix number
The sleeve for this single was xeroxed onto a manila envelope, the end of which was then cut off to make it the correct size.

The matrix number on the vinyl was taken from an item in a Long's Drug newspaper ad - there was no significance to this, there just had to be a number for the pressing company.

Chart positions

References 

1993 debut singles
Cake (band) songs
1993 songs
Songs written by John McCrea (musician)